Anatonchidae is a family of nematodes belonging to the order Dorylaimida.

Genera

Genera:
 Anatonchus Cobb, 1916
 Crassibucca Mulvey & Jensen, 1967
 Doronchus Andrassy, 1993

References

Nematode families